Serbs in France or French Serbs, number around 62,740 according to estimations. They are located mostly in the regions of Paris, Lyon, Grenoble, Belfort, Montbéliard, Mulhouse  and Strasbourg.

A wave of Serbs came with the influx of other Southern Europeans (Italians, Spaniards, Portuguese, and Greeks) in the 1920s. A minority are (descendants of) people of Serbian origin who were established in France in the aftermath of the First World War (e.g. Michel Auclair). Most Serbs however moved to France during the 1960s and 1970s, some also came as refugees during the Yugoslav wars of the 1990s.

Notable people
Pierre Marinovitch, World War I flying ace
Vladimir Veličković, painter
Ljubomir Popović, surrealist painter
Filip Nikolic, singer
Sara Brajovic, model and actress
Michel Auclair, film actor
Alexis Josic, architect
SebastiAn, musician
Aleksandar Josipović, dancer
Nikola Karabatić, handball player
Luka Karabatic, handball player
Kristina Mladenovic, tennis player
Irena Pavlovic, tennis player
Sara Cakarevic, tennis player
Danica Marinković, graphic designer 
Dušan Maravić, football player
Marko Muslin, football player
Lidija Turčinović, basketball player
Predrag Materić, basketball player
Barbara Pravi, singer, songwriter and actress (her paternal grandfather is Serbian, it's not her full nationality.)

See also
France–Serbia relations
St. Sava Church, Paris
Serb diaspora
Serbs in the United Kingdom
List of Serbian Canadians
List of Serbian Americans

References

External links
 French-Serbian friendship site (in French and Serbian only)
 Serbian Orthodox Church in France (in French and Serbian only)
 Serbian-French association (in French and Serbian only)
 Serbian-French cultural and sports association (in French and Serbian only)

France
European diaspora in France
 
France
France
France
France–Serbia relations
Immigration to France by country of origin
Serbian Orthodox Church in France